Carole Ann Pope (born 6 August 1950) is a British-born Canadian rock singer-songwriter, whose provocative blend of hard-edged new wave rock with explicit homoerotic and BDSM-themed lyrics made her one of the first openly lesbian entertainers to achieve mainstream fame.

Early life
Pope was born in the countryside outside of Manchester, England, on August 6, 1950. She was born the oldest of four children to Jack Pope - a salesman, member of the Communist Party of Great Britain, and circus stilt walker, and Celia, a music hall performer. She grew up with two sisters (Diane and Elaine) and one brother, Howard. Aged five, she immigrated with her parents to Montreal and was raised in the Toronto suburb of Scarborough, Ontario. She attended Cedarbrae Collegiate Institute.

Career

Rough Trade

Pope met her longtime musical partner Kevan Staples at a band audition in Scarborough. In 1968, they began performing together as a duo in Yorkville, which was Toronto's live music and arts district at the time. In 1970, they adopted the name O, changing it to The Bullwhip Brothers the following year.

In 1975, Pope and Staples recruited several backup musicians and formed the band Rough Trade. Pope often performed in black leather pants and bondage attire. The band's first album, Rough Trade Live, was produced by Jack Richardson.

Rough Trade released their first studio album, Avoid Freud, and also made an appearance in the Canadian horror film, Deadline, in 1980. They would win a Genie Award and four gold and two platinum records as the decade progressed. Although the band did not record or perform extensively after its final Deep Six in '86 tour, they did not officially break up until 1988. Since breaking up, the band has had numerous reunions, and in 2022, Rough Trade - The Musical, a musical based on the band's music (and the life of Pope's late brother, Howard), debuted at Joe's Pub, in Manhattan.

Solo career
In 1980, Pope sang backup vocals on Murray McLauchlan's album Into a Mystery and would go on to win the Juno Award for Most Promising Female Vocalist in 1981 and subsequently the Juno Award for Best Female Vocalist in 1982 and 1983. She and Staples co-wrote the 1983 single "Transformation" along with the track "Design for Living", for singer/songwriter Nona Hendryx's second studio album, Nona. Pope also appeared as a guest vocalist on the Payola$ single "Never Said I Loved You," which was a top 10 hit in 1983. She would team up again with Payola$ founder Paul Hyde to sing the duet "My Brilliant Career" on his album Living Off the Radar in 2000.

Pope sang the role of Primavera Nicholson in the COC production of R. Murray Schafer's Patria I in November 1987, and issued her debut solo single in 1988 - a cover of The Flirtations' 1968 soul hit, Nothing but a Heartache, with the self-penned "I'm Not Blind" as the B-side. In 1991, she moved to Los Angeles to pursue opportunities in soundtrack work and acting. This was followed by an EP, Radiate, in 1995. Two years later, Pope provided the voice for the schoolteacher in the animated version of Pippi Longstocking, and in 1999 playwright Bryden MacDonald staged Shaking the Foundations, a musical revue based on the music of Rough Trade. In 2000, Random House published Pope's autobiography, Anti Diva. The book included Pope's first public acknowledgement that she had been in a relationship with British singer Dusty Springfield in the early 1980s. That year she and Staples contributed a track to the Dusty Springfield tribute album Forever Dusty: Homage to an Icon. Anti Diva also revealed fleeting 1970s dalliances with comic actress Andrea Martin and music producer Bob Ezrin. Years later, Pope discussed attending Dusty Springfield's funeral where she spent time with the Pet Shop Boys, amongst other notables.

Soon afterwards, Pope re-recorded the Rough Trade single "High School Confidential" for the Queer as Folk season 1 soundtrack and appeared in the Toronto production of The Vagina Monologues in 2001.  She would then move to New York City to continue writing and recording. In 2005, 21 years after her last EP, Pope returned to Los Angeles and released Transcend, her debut full-length solo album.

In 2011, Pope released Landfall, her second full-length album, featuring a duet with Rufus Wainwright. That year she also was a guest vocalist on the album The Hills Are Alive by the Brooklyn Rundfunk Orkestrata.

Pope is an ambassador for the Harvey Milk School in New York City and a board director for the Songwriters Association of Canada. In 2015, Pope signed with Squirtgun Records (distributed by eOne Entertainment) to re-release the Music for Lesbians EP on 23 June 2015.

On 22 September 2017, Pope released the single, This Is Not A Test. An accompanying music video, directed by Jasun Mark, was released on 8 May 2018. Later that same year, Pope collaborated with keyboardist Kevin Hearn to release the single, Resist It, on 22 October 2018., which was later accompanied by a music video directed by Phillip Harder. A third single, I'm There, produced in collaboration with Spoons' keyboardist Rob Preuss, was released the following year.

In 2021, Pope released a song in collaboration with Ottawa band, Church of Trees, World's A Bitch, and later that year released Speaking In Code, a single produced alongside Canadian performer, Clara Venice. Venice had previously contributed Theremin to Pope's 2017 single, This Is Not A Test.

Pope was a guest judge on the third season of Canada's Drag Race.

Personal life 
Pope currently resides in New York.

Health 
In March 2018, Pope was forced to cancel a Toronto performance after suffering a fractured ankle. She later cancelled all Summer performances that same year after she experienced mobility issues whilst touring, and was later diagnosed with spinal stenosis. She underwent surgery and a fundraiser was created via GoFundMe to cover her living expenses.

Solo discography

Albums
 Transcend (2005)
 Landfall (2011)

EPs
 Radiate (1995, reissued in 2022)
 The Silencer (1999)
 Music for Lesbians (2014; 2015 re-release with Squirtgun/eOne)

Singles
"Nothing but a Heartache" / "I'm Not Blind" (1988, B-side reissued in 2022 as a single)
"Transcend" (1999)
"World Of One" (2000)
 "Johnny Marr" (2007)
 "Shining Path/Tell Me" (2010)
 "Viral 01/Viral 02" (2011)
 "Francis Bacon" (2013)
 "Lesbians in the Forest" (featuring Peaches) (2013)
 "Vagina Wolf" (2014)
 "This Is Not a Test" (2017)
 "Resist It" (with Kevin Hearn) (2018)
 "I'm There" (with Rob Preuss) (2019)
 "I Want to Live" (2020)
"World's a Bitch" (2021) (with Church of Trees and Rob Preuss)
"Speaking in Code" (2021) (with Clara Venice)

References

External links
 Carole Pope

Living people
Women new wave singers
Lesbian singers
Lesbian songwriters
Canadian lesbian musicians
Canadian women rock singers
Juno Award for Artist of the Year winners
Canadian LGBT singers
Canadian LGBT songwriters
English emigrants to Canada
Musicians from Manchester
Musicians from Toronto
Canadian new wave musicians
Juno Award for Breakthrough Artist of the Year winners
Rough Trade (band) members
1950 births
20th-century Canadian women singers
21st-century Canadian women singers
Canadian contraltos
20th-century Canadian LGBT people
21st-century Canadian LGBT people